The New Providence Football League was the highest form of football on the island of New Providence.

Before 2008, the champion of the New Providence Football League would compete with the champion of the Grand Bahama Football League to determine the national title. In 2008, the two leagues merged to form the BFA Senior League.

New Providence Football League Champions

1991/92 : Britam United
1992/93 : Britam United
1993/94 : Britam United
1994/95 : Britam United
1995/96 : JS Johnson United
1996/97 – Cavalier FC
1997/98 – Cavalier FC
1998/99 – Cavalier FC
1999/2000 – Cavalier FC

2000/01 – Cavalier FC
2001/02 – Bears FC
2002/03 – Bears FC
2003/04 – Bears FC
2005 – Caledonia Celtic
2005/06 – Caledonia Celtic
2007 – Bears FC
2008 – Bears FC

See also
 Grand Bahama Football League
 BFA Senior League

References
RSSSF archives

2
Second level football leagues in the Caribbean